The Weißseespitze is a mountain in the Weisskamm group of the Ötztal Alps. It has an elevation of 3,526 m above sea level.

References

External links
 "Weißseespitze" on Summitpost

Mountains of Tyrol (state)
Mountains of South Tyrol
Mountains of the Alps
Alpine three-thousanders
Ötztal Alps
Austria–Italy border
International mountains of Europe